James Megellas (March 11, 1917 – April 2, 2020) was a United States Army lieutenant colonel. During World War II, he was a rifle company platoon leader and is considered to be one of the most decorated combat officers in the history of the 82nd Airborne Division. He received the Distinguished Service Cross for extraordinary heroism and three other decorations for valor.

In his hometown of Fond du Lac, Wisconsin, a park, post office, and veterans' building was named after him.

Early life 
Megellas was born in Fond du Lac, Wisconsin on March 11, 1917, the son of a Greek-American family and attended Ripon College in the nearby city of Ripon. The attack on Pearl Harbor occurred midway through his senior year. He participated in the school's Reserve Officers' Training Corps program and, upon graduation in May 1942, received a commission as a second lieutenant in the U.S. Army.

World War II 
Megellas was originally assigned to the Signal Corps, but grew tired of the required additional schooling and volunteered to become a paratrooper in order to see combat. He was assigned to H Company, 3rd Battalion, 504th Parachute Infantry Regiment, 82nd Airborne Division. He first experienced combat in the mountains outside Naples, Italy, near Venafro, where he was wounded and hospitalized. In October 1943, while the remainder of the 82nd Airborne departed Italy to recoup before the invasion of Normandy, the 504th PIR remained behind and took part in Operation Shingle. On January 22, 1944, the 504th took part in an amphibious assault at Anzio. The fighting took a heavy toll, Megellas being wounded again. It was not until April before the regiment was withdrawn. Due to the losses at Anzio, the 504th did not participate in the D-Day Normandy Landings. They did, however, parachute into the Netherlands as part of Operation Market Garden, the airborne invasion of that country.

Megellas took part in the crossing of the Waal River near Nijmegen, where the American forces crossed the river in flimsy boats while under heavy machine gun fire. On September 30, in Holland, Megellas single-handedly attacked a German observation post and machine gun nest. For displaying extraordinary heroism that day, he was awarded the U.S. military's second-highest decoration, the Distinguished Service Cross. On December 20, for defeating the enemy at the base of a hill and rescuing one of his wounded men near Cheneux, Belgium, Megellas was awarded the Silver Star.

In late December, the regiment was rushed into the Battle of the Bulge.  On January 28, 1945, Megellas' platoon was advancing towards Herresbach, Belgium. Struggling through heavy snow and freezing cold, they surprised 200 Germans who were advancing out of the town. Catching the Germans largely off-guard, the attack proved to be devastating, with the Americans killing and capturing a large number and causing many others to flee. As they prepared to assault the town, however, a German Mark V tank took aim at them. Megellas ran towards it, and disabled it with a single grenade. Climbing on top of it, he then dropped another grenade into the tank, eliminating the threat to his men. He then led his men as they cleared and seized the town, and not one of his men was killed or injured. Although he was recommended for the Medal of Honor shortly afterward, he received the Silver Star (the German tank incident was not mentioned in his award citation).

Throughout the war, Megellas served with Company H, 504 PIR, which he would later come to command. In January 1946, he led his rifle company down Fifth Avenue in New York City in the Victory Parade.

Post-war life 

In 1946, Megellas left the active Army with the rank of captain and served for a further 16 years in the Army Reserve. He retired as a lieutenant colonel. he served with the United States Agency for International Development (USAID) from 1946 to 1978 and served two tours in the Vietnam War. He wrote a memoir of his wartime experiences entitled All the Way to Berlin: A Paratrooper at War in Europe. Megellas made an unsuccessful run as a Democrat against William Van Pelt to represent Wisconsin's 6th District in 1958 and 1960, and he served on the Fond du Lac city council until 1961. He was portrayed by John Ratzenberger in the 1977 film A Bridge Too Far. Megellas lived in Colleyville, Texas as of 2009. He turned 100 in March 2017 and died on April 2, 2020, in Colleyville, Texas, just 22 days after his 103rd birthday.

Military awards 
Megellas' military decorations and awards include the following:

Order of Saint Maurice in 2008.
Dallas Military Ball's Meritorious Service Award in 2009.
DAR Medal of Honor in 2010.
He was also the first American to be decorated by the Government of the Netherlands when he was awarded the Military Order of William Orange Lanyard. Selected by General James Gavin as the most outstanding officer of the 82nd Airborne Division, it was presented to him by the Dutch Minister of War in Berlin in 1945.

Medal of Honor
On May 21, 2013, Congressman Tom Petri of Wisconsin introduced H.R.2082 in the United States House of Representatives to request the President award the Medal of Honor (to upgrade his Silver Star to the MOH) to Megellas for his 'above and beyond' heroism on January 28, 1945, during the Battle of the Bulge. Senator John Cornyn also introduced the 'companion bill' S.993 into the U.S. Senate on that date. Both bills remained in committee and expired with the effluxion of the 113th Congress on 3 January 2015. In January 2017, Senate and House bills were again re-introduced. The Senate Bill S.238 was sponsored by U.S. Senator Ron Johnson of Wisconsin. The House bill H.R. 751 was sponsored by 6th Wisconsin District U.S. Representative Glenn Grothman.

Silver Star citation
Headquarters, 82d Airborne Division,
General Orders No. 35 (March 19, 1945)

The President of the United States of America, authorized by Act of Congress July 9, 1918, takes pleasure in presenting the Silver Star to First Lieutenant (Infantry) James Megellas (ASN:0-439607), United States Army, for gallantry in action while serving with Company H, 3d Battalion, 504th Parachute Infantry Regiment, 82d Airborne Division, in action on 28 January 1945, near Herresbach, Belgium. After breaking a trail across country for twelve hours in deep, dry snow, First Lieutenant Megellas, a platoon leader, was ordered to advance with his platoon and two supporting tanks along the main road leading into Herrebach. About one mile from the town, his platoon was fired upon by about 200 Germans forming a defense. Quickly grasping the situation, he led a frontal attack on the startled enemy who attempted to fight back. First Lieutenant Megellas' direction and leadership of his men was so superb that within ten minutes the entire force of enemy was either killed, captured, or fled into the town. He then reorganized his platoon, and with the two supporting tanks followed the enemy into the town. Braving heavy enemy sniper and rifle fire, he personally took a leading part in flushing the enemy out of their houses, killing eight and capturing five enemy. As a result of First Lieutenant Megellas' fierce leadership and skillful handing of his men, over 100 enemy were killed, 180 captured, and large amounts of valuable equipment fell into our hands. This feat was accomplished without the loss of a single man wounded or killed. First Lieutenant Megellas demonstrated a remarkable degree of tactical skill and a brand of courageous leadership which reflects highly upon himself and the Airborne Forces.

See also

List of Medal of Honor recipients

References

All the Way to Berlin: A Paratrooper at War in Europe, James Megellas, Presidio Press, 2003.

External links

Official website 
New 2013 House Bill H.R.2082 for Medal of Honor 
New 2013 Senate Bill S.993 for Medal of Honor
'All The Way To Berlin' - Random House
Interview on All the Way to Berlin at the Pritzker Military Museum & Library
Part 2 of Interview on All the Way to Berlin at the Pritzker Military Museum & Library

1917 births
2020 deaths
American centenarians
Men centenarians
United States Army personnel of World War II
American people of Greek descent
Military personnel from Wisconsin
People from Fond du Lac, Wisconsin
Recipients of the Distinguished Service Cross (United States)
Recipients of the Order of Saint Maurice
Recipients of the Silver Star
Ripon College (Wisconsin) alumni
United States Army officers
Wisconsin Democrats
Wisconsin city council members
Writers from Wisconsin